The 2 arrondissements of the Tarn-et-Garonne department of France are:
 Arrondissement of Castelsarrasin, (subprefecture: Castelsarrasin) with 103 communes.  The population of the arrondissement was 77,423 in 2016.  
 Arrondissement of Montauban, (prefecture of the Tarn-et-Garonne department: Montauban) with 92 communes.  The population of the arrondissement was 179,474 in 2016.

History

In 1800, the arrondissement of Montauban was created as a part of the department Lot, and the arrondissement of Castelsarrasin as a part of the department Haute-Garonne. In 1808 the department of Tarn-et-Garonne was created, with the arrondissements of Montauban, Castelsarrasin and Moissac. The arrondissement of Moissac was deleted in 1926.

References

Tarn-et-Garonne